Rob Lyttle (born 28 January 1997) is an Irish rugby union player who plays wing for Ulster.

Born in Donaghcloney, County Down, he played mini rugby at Dromore RFC as a child. He attended Royal Belfast Academical Institution, where he appeared in the Ulster Schools' Cup final in 2013. He then moved to Methodist College Belfast, with whom he made the Schools' Cup semi-finals. He was signed to the Ulster academy. He made his senior debut, scoring two tries, against the Dragons in September 2016. He made his fiftieth appearance against Scarlets in January 2022.

References

External links
Ulster Rugby profile
United Rugby Championship profile

1997 births
Living people
People educated at Methodist College Belfast
Rugby union players from County Down
Rugby union wings
Ulster Rugby players
Irish rugby union players